The Chinese Ambassador to Panama is the official representative of the People's Republic of China to the Republic of Panama since 2017.

List of representatives

References

Ambassadors of China to Panama
Panama
China